The 1932 Republican National Convention was held at Chicago Stadium in Chicago, Illinois, from June 14 to June 16, 1932. It nominated President Herbert Hoover and Vice President Charles Curtis for reelection.

Hoover was virtually unopposed for the nomination. Despite the ongoing situation facing the Republican Party, the convention praised Hoover and pledged itself to maintain a balanced budget.

Presidential nomination

Presidential candidates 

Republicans gloomily gathered in Chicago for the 20th Republican National Convention. Los Angeles attorney Joseph Scott delivered President Hoover's nominating address, praising him as the man who taught the nation to resist the temptations of governmental paternalism. Hoover was re-nominated on the first ballot without significant opposition. To have repudiated the incumbent would have destroyed what little chance of victory the party had amid the worst economic depression in U.S. history.

Former senator Joseph I. France of Maryland attempted to engineer a draft-Coolidge movement, but the former president expressed no interest in the nomination.

Presidential Balloting / 3rd Day of Convention (June 16, 1932)

Vice Presidential nomination

Vice Presidential candidates 

Vice President Curtis experienced more difficulties than President Hoover in securing his party's re-nomination. It took the fervid appeals of Hoover's cabinet members to keep the Illinois delegation from nominating former Vice President Charles Dawes for his old office. Curtis nonetheless still had to fight for his re-nomination despite the disorganization of his opposition by the advance refusal of Dawes to accept the nomination for second place. Ambassador Hanford MacNider and RCA Chairman James Harbord, both military professionals, were the primary beneficiaries of the opposition to Curtis.

The initial roll call revealed Curtis to be 18 votes shy of securing re-nomination. At this point, Pennsylvania switched its 75 votes from favorite son Edward Martin to Curtis. After Curtis had secured the vice presidential nomination, the delegates moved to make his re-nomination unanimous.

Vice Presidential Balloting / 3rd Day of Convention (June 16, 1932)

See also 
 History of the United States Republican Party
 List of Republican National Conventions
 U.S. presidential nomination convention
 Republican Party presidential primaries, 1932
 1932 United States presidential election
 1932 Democratic National Convention

References

Bibliography 

 Pietrusza, David 1932: The Rise of Hitler & FDR: Two Tales of Politics, Betrayal and Unlikely Destiny Lyons Press Guilford, CT 2015.

External links 
 Republican Party platform of 1932 at The American Presidency Project
 Hoover acceptance address at The American Presidency Project
 Hoover acceptance letter at The American Presidency Project

Republican National Conventions
1932 United States presidential election
Political conventions in Chicago
1932 in Illinois
1932 conferences
June 1932 events